The Best of Ten Wheel Drive is the sole compilation by Ten Wheel Drive. It was released in 1995. This marked the first occasion the included tracks appeared on CD.

Track listing

References

External links
 

1995 compilation albums
Ten Wheel Drive albums